Careproctus pallidus is a species of snailfish found around Tierra del Fuego in the far south of South America.

This is an unusual fish compared to its congeners. Most Careproctus species are found in deep water but this is a fish of shallow coastal waters. It is an orange fish, up to 70 mm standard length with a heavy body and large pectoral and caudal fins and superficially resembles members of the largely Northern Hemisphere genus Liparis.

References

Liparidae
Taxa named by Léon Vaillant
Fish described in 1888